A texture artist is an individual who develops textures for digital media, usually for video games, movies, web sites and television shows. These textures can be in the form of 2D or (rarely) 3D art that may be overlaid onto a polygon mesh to create a realistic 3D model.

Texture artists often take advantage of web sites for the purposes of marketing their art and self-promotion of their skills with the goal of gaining employment from a professional game studio or to join a team working on a "mod" (modification) of an existing game in hopes of establishing industry or trade credentials.

See also

Digital art
Texture map
UV map
UVW map
Normal mapping

References

Computer graphics
Digital art